Deep Creek Wilderness is a  wilderness area in the US state of Utah. It was designated March 30, 2009, as part of the Omnibus Public Land Management Act of 2009.

See also
 List of U.S. Wilderness Areas
 Wilderness Act

References

External links
 
 

Wilderness areas of Utah
Zion National Park
Protected areas of Washington County, Utah
Bureau of Land Management areas in Utah
Protected areas established in 2009
2009 establishments in Utah